The District of Oregon was a Union Army command department formed during the American Civil War.

History
The District of Oregon was part of the independent Department of the Pacific reconstituted by consolidating the Departments of California and Oregon, which was created on January 15, 1861 when the Army was reorganized. The district was created the same day, and comprised the same territory as the former Department of Oregon, the state of Oregon (except for the areas of the Rogue River and Umpqua River in Southern Oregon) and Washington Territory, with headquarters at Fort Vancouver in Washington Territory.

On March 3, 1865 the district included Idaho Territory after it was formed from the eastern part of Washington Territory. On March 14, 1865, the District of Oregon was extended to include the entire state of Oregon.

On July 27, 1865 the Military Division of the Pacific was created under Major General Henry W. Halleck, replacing the Department of the Pacific. It consisted of the Department of the Columbia replacing the District of Oregon and the Department of California. George Wright, now a U. S. Army Brigadier General, was assigned to command the new Department of the Columbia.

District of Oregon commanders
 Colonel George Wright, January 15, 1861 – September 13, 1861.
 Colonel Benjamin L. Beall, September 13, 1861 – October 23, 1861.
 Lieutenant Colonel Albemarle Cady, October 23, 1861 – May 5, 1862
 Colonel Justus Steinberger May 5, 1862 – July 7, 1862
 Brigadier General Benjamin Alvord, July 7, 1862 – March 23, 1865
 Colonel Reuben F. Maury, March 23, 1865 – June 27, 1865

Posts in the District of Oregon
 Fort Colville, Washington Territory, 1859–1882
 Fort Steilacoom, Washington Territory, (1849–1868)
 Fort Dalles, Oregon, 1850–1867
 Fort Vancouver, Washington Territory 1853–1879
 Fort Bellingham, Washington Territory  (1855–1860)
 Fort Cascades, Washington Territory  (1855–1861)
 Fort Yamhill, Oregon (1856–1866)
 Fort Townsend, Washington Territory (1856–1861)
 Fort Walla Walla, Washington Territory 1856–1911
 Fort Hoskins, Oregon, 1857–1865
 Siletz Blockhouse, Oregon 1858–1866  
 Camp Pickett, Washington Territory (1859–1863)
 Post of San Juan, Washington Territory  (1863–1867)
 Camp Chehalis, Washington Territory (1860–1861)
 Camp Baker, Oregon 1862–1865,
 Camp Barlow, Oregon, 1862 
 Camp Clackamas, Oregon, 1862 
 Post at Cape Disappointment, Washington Territory, 1862–1864 
Fort Cape Disappointment, Washington Territory, 1864–1875
 Camp Lapwai, Idaho Territory, 1862
 Fort Lapwai, Idaho Territory, 1862–1884
 Fort Boise, Idaho Territory, 1863–1912
 Post at Grand Ronde Indian Agency or Fort Lafayette, Oregon 1863,
 Fort Hall, Idaho Territory, 1863–1865
 Fort Klamath, Oregon, 1863–1890
 Fort at Point Adams, Oregon  1863–? 
 Camp Alvord, Oregon 1864–1866 
 Camp Dalgren, Oregon 1864 
 Camp Henderson, Oregon, 1864–1866 
 Camp Lincoln, Oregon 1864
 Camp Maury, Oregon 1864
 Camp Russell, Oregon 1864–1865 
 Camp Watson, Oregon 1864–1869
 Camp Colfax, Oregon, 1865, 1867
 Camp Currey, Oregon  1865–1866 
 Camp Lander, Idaho Territory, 1865–1866 
 Camp Logan, Oregon 1865–1868 
 Camp Lyon, Idaho 1865–1869 
 Camp Polk, Oregon 1865–1866 
 Camp Reed, Idaho Territory 1865–1866 
 Camp on Silvies River, Oregon ? 
 Camp Wright, Oregon 1865–1866 
 Old Camp Warner, Oregon 1866–1867
 Camp Warner, Oregon 1867–1874

See also
Idaho in the American Civil War
Montana in the American Civil War
Oregon in the American Civil War
Washington in the American Civil War
Snake War

References

Oregon
Oregon, District of
Pacific Coast Theater of the American Civil War
California in the American Civil War
Oregon in the American Civil War
Idaho in the American Civil War
Washington (state) in the American Civil War
1861 establishments in Oregon